The Week Never Starts Round Here is the debut studio album by Scottish indie rock band Arab Strap. It was released on 25 November 1996 on Chemikal Underground. The album was reissued in 2010, with a bonus CD which includes the band's first session for John Peel, from March 1997 with guest appearances from Belle and Sebastian's Stuart Murdoch and Chris Geddes, and their first ever live gig, at King Tut's in Glasgow in October 1996, as recorded live for Peel's show.

Arab Strap later included a song entitled "The Week Never Starts Round Here" on their 2003 album Monday at the Hug and Pint. In a 2009 interview, band member Malcolm Middleton stated that The Week Never Starts Round Here is his favourite Arab Strap release: "...it's completely undiluted and free from any self-expectations, which we later developed".

Track listing

References

Arab Strap (band) albums
1996 debut albums
Chemikal Underground albums